American Hustle is a 2013 American historical black comedy crime film directed by David O. Russell. It was written by Eric Warren Singer and Russell, inspired by the FBI Abscam operation of the late 1970s and early 1980s. It stars Christian Bale and Amy Adams as two con artists who are forced by an FBI agent (Bradley Cooper) to set up an elaborate sting operation on corrupt politicians, including the mayor of Camden, New Jersey (Jeremy Renner). Jennifer Lawrence plays the unpredictable wife of Bale's character. Principal photography took place from March to May 2013 in Boston and Worcester, Massachusetts as well as New York City.

American Hustle was released nationwide in the United States on December 13, 2013. It opened to acclaim from critics, who praised its screenplay and ensemble cast. The film received ten nominations at the 86th Academy Awards, including Best Picture, Best Director, Best Original Screenplay, Best Actor (Bale), Best Actress (Adams), Best Supporting Actor (Cooper), and Best Supporting Actress (Lawrence). It received three BAFTA Awards, three Golden Globe Awards, including Best Motion Picture – Musical or Comedy, and the Screen Actors Guild Award for Outstanding Performance by a Cast in a Motion Picture.

Plot

In 1978, con artists Irving Rosenfeld and Sydney Prosser have started a relationship, and are working together. She has improved his scams, posing as English aristocrat "Lady Edith Greensly". Irving loves Sydney, but is hesitant to leave his unstable and histrionic wife Rosalyn, fearing he will lose contact with his adopted son Danny. Rosalyn has also threatened to report Irving to the police if he leaves her. 

FBI agent Richie DiMaso catches Irving and Sydney in a loan scam, but offers to release them if Irving can line up four additional arrests. Richie believes Sydney is English, but has proof that her claim of aristocracy is fraudulent. She tells Irving she will manipulate Richie, distancing herself from Irving.

Irving has a friend pretending to be a wealthy Arab sheikh looking for potential investments in America. An associate of Irving's suggests the sheikh do business with Mayor Carmine Polito of Camden, New Jersey, who is trying to revitalize gambling in Atlantic City, but has struggled to find investors. Carmine seems to have a genuine desire to help the area's economy and his constituents. 

Richie devises a plan to make Mayor Polito the target of a sting operation, despite the objections of Irving and of Richie's boss, Stoddard Thorsen. Sydney helps Richie manipulate an FBI secretary into making an unauthorized wire transfer of $2 million. When Stoddard's boss, Anthony Amado, hears of the operation, he praises Richie's initiative, pressuring Stoddard to continue.

Carmine leaves their meeting when Richie presses him to accept a cash bribe. Irving convinces him the sheikh is legitimate, expressing his dislike of Richie, and they become friends. Richie arranges for Carmine to meet the sheikh, and without consulting the others, has Mexican-American FBI agent Paco Hernandez play the sheikh, which displeases Irving. 

Carmine brings the sheikh to a casino party, explaining that mobsters are there, and that it is a necessary part of doing business. Irving is surprised to hear that Mafia boss Victor Tellegio, right-hand man to Meyer Lansky, is present, and that he wants to meet the sheikh. Tellegio explains that the sheikh needs to become an American citizen, and that Carmine will need to expedite the process. Tellegio also requires a $10 million wire transfer to prove the sheikh's legitimacy.

Richie confesses his strong attraction to Sydney, but becomes confused and aggressive when she drops her English accent and admits to being from Albuquerque. Rosalyn starts an affair with mobster Pete Musane, whom she met at the party. She mentions her belief that Irving is working with the IRS, causing Pete to threaten Irving, who promises to prove the sheikh's investment is real. 

Irving later confronts Rosalyn, who admits she told Pete and agrees to keep quiet, but wants a divorce. With Carmine's help, Richie and Irving videotape members of Congress receiving bribes. Richie assaults Stoddard in a fight over the money, and later convinces Amado that he needs the $10 million to get Tellegio, but gets only $2 million. A meeting is arranged at the offices of Tellegio's lawyer, Alfonse Simone, but Tellegio does not appear.

Irving visits Carmine and admits to the scam, but says he has a plan to help him. He throws him out, and the loss of their friendship deeply upsets Irving. The federal agents inform Irving that their $2 million is missing, and that they have received an anonymous offer to return the money in exchange for Irving and Sydney's immunity and a reduced sentence for Carmine. 

It is revealed that Alfonse Simone, with whom Richie had arranged the wire transfer, was a con man working with Irving and Sydney. Amado accepts the deal, and Stoddard removes Richie from the case, which ends his career. The Congressmen are prosecuted, and so is Carmine, who is sentenced to 18 months in prison. Irving and Sydney move in together and open a legitimate art gallery, while Rosalyn lives with Pete and shares custody of Danny with Irving.

Cast

Production

Development

The film began as an Eric Warren Singer screenplay titled American Bullshit. It was listed at #8 on the 2010 Black List of unproduced screenplays. The production was set up at Columbia Pictures, with Charles Roven and Richard Suckle producing through Atlas Entertainment, who initially considered Ben Affleck to direct, before David O. Russell ultimately signed on to helm the film. Russell re-wrote Singer's screenplay, replacing the characters with caricatures of their respective real-life figures. Russell regarded Hustle, a highly fictionalized version of the Abscam scandal of the late 1970s and early 1980s, as the third in a loose trilogy of films about ordinary people trying to live passionate lives.

Filming
Principal photography started on March 8, 2013, and wrapped in May 2013. The film was shot in and around Boston, Massachusetts (such as in Worcester), and in New York City. Filming was put on hold in the aftermath of the Boston Marathon bombings with the city in lockdown. After lockdown was lifted, the film wrapped its Boston shoot and spent its final few days of production in New York City.

Music

Release
Director David O. Russell released the teaser trailer for the film on July 31, 2013, and a theatrical trailer was released on October 9, 2013. The film received nationwide United States release on December 13, 2013.

American Hustle was released on DVD and Blu-ray on March 18, 2014.

Reception

Christian Bale, Amy Adams, Jennifer Lawrence and Bradley Cooper's performances were all very well praised by the critics and earned them all Oscar nominations of Best Actor (Bale), Best Actress (Adams), Best Supporting Actress (Lawrence) and Best Supporting Actor (Cooper).

American Hustle received critical acclaim, and the cast received praise for their performances, notably Christian Bale, Amy Adams, Bradley Cooper and Jennifer Lawrence. Review aggregation website Rotten Tomatoes gives the film a 92% rating, based on 299 reviews, with an average score of 8.2/10. The website's critical consensus reads: "Riotously funny and impeccably cast, American Hustle compensates for its flaws with unbridled energy and some of David O. Russell's most irrepressibly vibrant direction." Metacritic gives a score of 90 out of 100, based on 47 critics, indicating "universal acclaim". Audiences polled by CinemaScore gave the film an average grade of "B+" on an A+ to F scale.

Christy Lemire awarded the film four out of four stars, praising David O. Russell's directing and the relationship between Irving and Sydney, as well as Jennifer Lawrence's portrayal of Rosalyn. She writes: "For all its brashness and big personality, American Hustle is a character study at its core—an exploration of dissatisfaction and drive, and the lengths to which we're willing to go for that elusive thing known as a better life." Richard Roeper of the Chicago Sun-Times gave the film an A+, especially complimenting Bradley Cooper's performance and stating that American Hustle was "the best time I've had at the movies all year". He later named it the year's best film. Time magazine's Richard Corliss wrote: "American Hustle is an urban eruption of flat-out fun — the sharpest, most exhilarating comedy in years. Anyone who says otherwise must be conning you."

Peter Debruge of Variety was critical of the film, calling it "a sloppy sprawl of a movie" and complaining that the improvisational performances overwhelm, instead of adding to a coherent plot. He also went on to write that it "makes your brain hurt — and worse, overwhelms the already over-complicated Abscam re-telling at the center of the film".

Box office

Variety estimated the production budget at $40 million. When producer Charles Roven was asked if the budget was in the $40 to $50 million area, he responded: "I'd say that's a good zone."

The film earned $150.1 million in North American and $101.1 million in international markets, for a worldwide total of $251.2 million. It made a net profit of $27 million, when factoring together all expenses and revenues for the film.

Accolades

American Hustle received seven Golden Globe Award nominations; it won for Best Motion Picture – Musical or Comedy, with Amy Adams and Jennifer Lawrence winning Best Actress – Motion Picture Musical or Comedy and Best Supporting Actress – Motion Picture, respectively.

The film received 10 Oscar nominations, including Best Picture, Best Director, Best Original Screenplay, and all four acting categories, but did not win in any category. The film received the second highest number of nominations for a film which did not win any Oscars, a distinction it shares with True Grit and Gangs of New York, after the 11 for 1977's The Turning Point and 1985's The Color Purple. It was the 15th film ever to be nominated in the four acting categories, and only the second since 1981, after 2012's Silver Linings Playbook, which Russell also directed. Of the fifteen such films, it joins only 1936's My Man Godfrey and 1950's Sunset Boulevard to not win any acting awards.

The film took top honors at the 20th Screen Actors Guild Awards, winning for Outstanding Cast in a Motion Picture.

The film was nominated for 10 British Academy Film Awards, with Jennifer Lawrence winning for Actress in a Supporting Role, and David O. Russell and Eric Warren Singer winning for Best Original Screenplay.

Lawsuit
In October 2014, science writer Paul Brodeur filed a defamation lawsuit against the producers and distributors of American Hustle based on a line in the film in which Rosalyn tells Irving that microwave ovens take the nutrition out of food, stating that she read so in an article by Brodeur. In real life, Brodeur has written books including The Zapping of America about the dangers of microwave radiation, but claims that he has never stated that the process removes a food's nutrition. The defendants immediately filed a motion under California's anti-SLAPP statute to strike the complaint and award them attorney fees, which the trial court initially denied. The decision was reversed by the California Court of Appeal, which held that the motion should have been granted because "the general tenor of American Hustle, the entirely farcical nature of the 'science oven' scene, and the ditzy nature of the character uttering the allegedly defamatory statement, all indicate that an audience would not expect anything Rosalyn says to reflect objective fact" and that, in view of this, Brodeur "failed to carry his burden of showing a probability of prevailing on his defamation claim".

Historical accuracy

American Hustle is a dramatization of the FBI's "Abscam" sting operation in the late 1970s and early '80s that led to the convictions of seven members of the United States Congress, among others. The film does not attempt to directly document the events of Abscam. The names are changed, and the film begins with the on-screen message, "Some of this actually happened". Major departures from reality include:
 In the film, Irving Rosenfeld begins a life of criminality when he smashes storefront windows as a child in order to provide more work for his father's glass-installation business. In real life, Melvin Weinberg began working for his father only as an adult. He did smash windows at that point, and according to one article after Abscam was revealed, it was indeed done to shore up business for Weinberg's father. A later report states that it was done at the behest of the local union, to punish businesses who used non-union glaziers.
 In the film, Camden Mayor Carmine Polito is shown as a selfless politician who gets involved in the scam only to provide jobs to his constituents; Irving feels so bad for Carmine that he engineers a reduced sentence for him. In reality, Camden mayor Angelo Errichetti had a reputation for committing crimes, despite being widely praised for caring about the people of Camden. During the Abscam operation, he offered to get the fake sheik into illegal businesses such as money counterfeiting and drug smuggling. Though Weinberg developed a fondness for Errichetti as a man who "didn't beat around the bush", he made no attempt to protect Errichetti from prosecution.
 Evelyn Knight, Weinberg's mistress on whom the character of Sydney Prosser is based, was involved in Weinberg's scams, though to a lesser extent than shown in the film; and she was not involved in Abscam. She was also English, not an American impersonating an English woman as shown in the film.
 Weinberg's wife Cynthia Marie Weinberg, the basis for Rosalyn Rosenfeld, is not known to have had an affair with someone from the mafia, nor did she nearly blow Weinberg's cover. She was also of similar age to Melvin Weinberg, while the character of Rosalyn is portrayed as being significantly younger than her husband.
 The character of Richie DiMaso is based to some extent on federal agent Tony Amoroso, although in real life Amoroso was just one of a number of agents involved in setting up and executing the scam.
 In the film, the sheik is impersonated by a Mexican-American FBI agent. In real life, the sheik was played by two different agents: first briefly by an Irish-American, Mike Denehy, who spoke no Arabic, then by a Lebanese-American.

See also
 List of Big Five Academy Award winners and nominees
 List of films with all four Academy Award acting nominations

References

External links

 
 
 

2013 films
2013 crime drama films
2013 LGBT-related films
Abscam
Adultery in films
American crime drama films
American LGBT-related films
American heist films
Crime films based on actual events
Cultural depictions of the Mafia
Drama films based on actual events
2010s English-language films
Bisexuality-related films
Female bisexuality in film
Lesbian-related films
Salary controversies in film
Casting controversies in film
Works subject to a lawsuit
Film controversies in the United States
Films about con artists
Films about fraud
Films about politicians
Films about the American Mafia
Films set in 1978
Films set in New Jersey
Films set in New York (state)
Films set in New York City
Films set in Philadelphia
Films set in Washington, D.C.
Films shot in Boston
Films shot in Massachusetts
Films shot in New Jersey
Films shot in New York (state)
Films shot in New York City
BAFTA winners (films)
Best Musical or Comedy Picture Golden Globe winners
Films featuring a Best Musical or Comedy Actress Golden Globe winning performance
Films featuring a Best Supporting Actress Golden Globe-winning performance
Films whose writer won the Best Original Screenplay BAFTA Award
Films directed by David O. Russell
Films produced by Charles Roven
Films produced by Megan Ellison
Films produced by Richard Suckle
Films scored by Danny Elfman
Annapurna Pictures films
Atlas Entertainment films
Columbia Pictures films
Entertainment One films
2010s American films